Identity is the second album from the Canadian R&B singer Raghav with an international release in 2010. The album was pre-released in 2009 in a concert in New Delhi, India on Universal Music.

Singles
"My Kinda Girl" - The first single was released on October 13, 2008. It features the popular US rapper Redman.
"Humrahee" - The second single from the album, a Hindi track.

Track listing

Raghav albums
2009 albums